Rose of the Rancho may refer to:
 Rose of the Rancho (1914 film), an American silent Western film
 Rose of the Rancho (1936 film), an American action film